Oxelösund is a locality and the seat of Oxelösund Municipality in Södermanland County, Sweden with 11,488 inhabitants in 2018.

History 
The harbour at Oxelösund has been used for at least 500 years. In the 19th century, an increased extraction from the mining district of Central Sweden (e.g. Bergslagen), made Oxelösund a harbour of transport. A local railroad company was established in 1873, and bought virtually the entire peninsula which at the time belonged to the estates of the Stjärnholm Castle.

An iron works was constructed in 1913, and the community Oxelösund expanded, with the harbour, rail road and iron works being its cornerstones.

In 1950, the city was sufficiently developed to get the title of a city and was one of the last towns to receive city status in Sweden. Since 1971 this status is obsolete, but Oxelösund is the seat of a municipality with the same territory, one of the smallest in the country.

In November 2011, Oxelösund hosted the Nordic Under-21 Championships in underwater rugby.

Femöre battery is located near the area.

Companies 
SSAB, Swedish steel.

Climate 
Oxelösund has a hybrid between a maritime and humid continental climate, with moderated patterns which stem from its position at the head of a peninsula, with the weather station facing the open sea. In much of the urban area and up the peninsula the climate is somewhat more prone to swings, something intensifying farther north as in Nyköping.

References

External links

 

Municipal seats of Södermanland County
Swedish municipal seats
Populated places in Södermanland County
Populated places in Oxelösund Municipality
Coastal cities and towns in Sweden
Port cities and towns of the Baltic Sea